Hong Jingyu (洪静宇) (born 2 July 1984 in Beijing), also known as Jing Yu Hong, is a professional badminton player from China who is a doubles and mixed specialist. She started her badminton career at the age of 9.

At age 11, Hong left home to train full-time at a professional sports center. In 2002, she was recognized for her abilities and was selected for the Chinese National Youth Team. She was selected to go to the China National 2nd Tier Team for Women Doubles. During her time with the National Team she won recognition and several titles in China's National Team and individual tournaments.

In 2012 Hong joined the EastBay Badminton Association and is representing the United States.

Achievement

BWF Grand Prix 
The BWF Grand Prix has two levels, the Grand Prix and Grand Prix Gold. It is a series of badminton tournaments sanctioned by the Badminton World Federation (BWF) since 2007.

Women's doubles

Mixed doubles

 BWF Grand Prix Gold tournament
 BWF Grand Prix tournament

BWF International Challenge/Series 
Women's doubles

 BWF International Challenge tournament
 BWF International Series tournament

Mixed doubles

USA National Tournaments 

Women singles

Mixed doubles

Women's doubles

References

External links
 

1984 births
Living people
Sportspeople from Beijing
Chinese female badminton players
American female badminton players
American sportspeople of Chinese descent
Badminton players from Beijing
21st-century American women